Charles of the Ritz is a former cosmetics brand known for its line of perfumes.

History
In 1916, hairdresser Charles Jundt took over the Manhattan beauty salon of the New York City Ritz (later the Ritz-Carlton) hotel.  He founded his own cosmetics company in 1919, and in 1926, began marketing beauty products under the name "Charles of the Ritz".  Perfume was added to this line in 1927.

In 1932, at the age of 24, Richard B. Salomon was named president of Charles of the Ritz, Inc. Twenty years later, he was elected chairman and chief executive officer. Salomon became known internationally as a businessman, philanthropist and humanitarian. He also served as chancellor of Brown University from 1979-88.

In 1935, Charles of the Ritz launched the highly successful Jean Naté line of body splashes and fragrance. They later acquired the cosmetics company Alexandra de Markoff.

Expansion 

Charles of the Ritz expanded distribution from upscale salons into upper-end department stores like Saks Fifth Avenue and Neiman Marcus. In the early 1950s, he was said to have mocked Estée Lauder and her practice of free samples and gifts with purchase, saying "You will never go anywhere in this industry."

In 1963, Ritz acquired 80% of the house of Yves Saint Laurent. Ritz launched an entire line of skincare and makeup under the Yves Saint Laurent Beaute brand. In 1964 Charles of the Ritz merged with the Lanvin group. It was from then on known as Lanvin-Charles of the Ritz. In 1969 the prominent makeup artist Way Bandy joined Charles of the Ritz as the salon director of makeup.

Ownership changes 

In 1972, Richard B. Salomon retired, and the company was acquired by pharmaceutical company E.R. Squibb, with a market value of $100 million.

In 1977, Yves Saint Laurent Beaute launched Opium. In 1978, Ritz introduced a new women's fragrance, Enjoli, designed (as noted in its popular television commercials) as "the eight hour perfume for the 24-hour woman"; the commercial's theme song was a remake of Peggy Lee's 1963 hit song "I'm A Woman". In 1984 Charles of the Ritz launched Forever Krystle and Carrington, successful fragrances based on American television drama Dynasty characters.

In 1986, Squibb sold the entire division back to Yves Saint Laurent for $500 million, who invested heavily in a new men's fragrance called Jazz. Jazz was not particularly successful and, coupled with the October 1987 market crash, Yves Saint Laurent sold Charles of the Ritz Incorporated (excluding Yves Saint Laurent Beaute) to Revlon in 1987. Still reeling from its unsuccessful takeover attempt of Gillette in 1983, Revlon declared they were interested in  several acquisitions and also bought Max Factor, Almay, Halston, Borghese, and Germaine Monteil.

Under Revlon, the brand Charles of the Ritz began to slip in image and prestige. In 1991 they launched a line called Express, aimed at a more savvy customer. The brand became associated with mid-price stores like J. C. Penney and maintained a focus on the "mature" customer. After several years of unsuccessful revival attempts (including an endorsement deal with Kathie Lee Gifford for their Timeless line) and facing massive debt, Revlon put (among many others) the line for sale, but had no takers. Analysts suggested the very name — Charles of the Ritz — lacked consumer recognition.

Demise 

Revlon shut down Charles of the Ritz in 2002. Many of the former Ritz fragrances, such as Enjoli, are sold today under the Revlon name.

Fragrances
Below is a list of the house fragrances and their year of launch.

References

Cosmetics companies of the United States
Perfume houses
History of cosmetics
Defunct companies based in New York City
Design companies established in 1919
Companies disestablished in 2002
1919 establishments in New York (state)
2002 disestablishments in New York (state)
Revlon brands